Topolcani is a village in the Prilep Municipality of North Macedonia. It used to be a municipality itself and its FIPS code was MKA7.

Demographics
According to the 2002 census, the village had a total of 449 inhabitants. Ethnic groups in the village include:

Macedonians 449

References

Villages in Prilep Municipality